Dr. Harry L. Halliwell School is an elementary school in the Slatersville village of North Smithfield, Rhode Island, USA (in Providence County).

History
The Halliwell School was constructed in 1957 on the grounds of a former sheep farm and was named after local school pediatrician, Dr. Harry Halliwell, who died at age thirty-two from polio after treating polio stricken children in the 1950s. Prior to the completion of the Halliwell school, North Smithfield students attended Kendall Dean School in Slatersville. The Halliwell school closed in 2019 when a new addition was completed on the North Smithfield Elementary School. The Halliwell School grounds are currently the location of the North Smithfield Community Garden and a playground.

See also
Schools in Rhode Island

References

External links

Public elementary schools in Rhode Island
Schools in Providence County, Rhode Island
1958 establishments in Rhode Island
Educational institutions established in 1958